Mahathir Mohamad formed the fifth Mahathir cabinet after being invited by Tuanku Jaafar to begin a new government following the 25 April 1995 general election in Malaysia. Prior to the election, Mahathir led (as Prime Minister) the fourth Mahathir cabinet, a coalition government that consisted of members of the component parties of Barisan Nasional. It was the 13th cabinet of Malaysia formed since independence.

This is a list of the members of the fifth cabinet of the fourth Prime Minister of Malaysia, Mahathir Mohamad.

Composition

Full members
The federal cabinet consisted of the following ministers:

Deputy ministers

See also
 Members of the Dewan Rakyat, 9th Malaysian Parliament
 List of parliamentary secretaries of Malaysia#Fifth Mahathir cabinet

References

Cabinet of Malaysia
1995 establishments in Malaysia
1999 disestablishments in Malaysia
Cabinets established in 1995
Cabinets disestablished in 1999